The Itirapina Ecological Station is an Ecological station in the state of São Paulo, Brazil.

Location

The Itirapina Ecological Station is divided between the municipalities of Brotas (44.15%) and Itirapina (55.85%) in the state of São Paulo.
The area contains a sample of remnants of cerrado vegetation, and also has an important fluvial network that supplies the Lobo Dam.

94% of the ecological station has cerrado vegetation, mostly rocky, clean or wet meadows, as well as cerrado strict sense, riverside forests and cerradão. 
The experimental station covers  including a large area reforested with fast-growing pine and eucalyptus.
It is used for forestry research.

History

The Itirapina Ecological Station was created by Governor André Franco Montoro by state decree 22.335 of 7 June 1984.
The ecological station was on publicly owned land.
It had the objective of ensuring the integrity of the ecosystems and river complex it contains, protecting its fauna and flora, and supporting scientific research and education.

Notes

Sources

Ecological stations of Brazil
Protected areas established in 1984
1984 establishments in Brazil
Protected areas of São Paulo (state)